James D. Runnels (born June 19, 1984) is an American football coach and former fullback who is the co-offensive coordinator and running backs coach for the Houston Gamblers of the United States Football League (USFL). He played college football at Oklahoma from 2002 to 2005. He played in the National Football League (NFL) for 4 seasons from 2006–2009 with his longest tenue as a player with the Chicago Bears.

Runnels was born in Midwest City, Oklahoma. He attended high school at Carl Albert High School in Midwest City. After graduation from high school in 2002, he enrolled at the University of Oklahoma and played running back for the Sooners.

The Chicago Bears selected Runnels in the sixth round of the 2006 NFL Draft. He played 4 seasons as a fullback in the NFL, with the Chicago from 2006 to 2007, the Tampa Bay Buccaneers in 2008 and the Cincinnati Bengals from 2008 to 2009. He also played and a season in the United Football League (UFL) with the Florida Tuskers.

Early years
Runnels attended Carl Albert High School in Midwest City where he played football, mostly at running back, but he also played wide receiver, tight end and defensive end. He helped lead Carl Albert to three Oklahoma state championships in class 5A. He was a consensus all state player and set school records for career receiving yards (1,391), career catches (67) and career receiving touchdowns (17). Runnels finished 3rd in state in 4A Shotput.  Runnels graduated from Carl Albert in 2002.

College career
Runnels attended the University of Oklahoma. In 53 games at Oklahoma, Runnels started 18 times. He carried twice for five yards and caught 51 passes for 450 yards (8.8 avg) and five touchdowns. In his agility tests he ran a 4.52 in the 40-yard dash, bench pressed 225 pounds 28 times, had a 35-inch vertical jump, a 10'0" broad jump, ran a 4.22 in the 20-yard shuttle, and a 7.0 in the 3 cone drill.

Professional career

Chicago Bears
He was drafted by the Chicago Bears in the 6th round of the 2006 NFL Draft. He spent most of his rookie season on the bench, but saw playtime towards the end of the season, when starting fullback Jason McKie injured his ankle. Although Runnels was the Bears' second fullback on the depth chart, the Bears often used the more experienced third-string tight end, Gabe Reid instead. The Bears waived/injured Runnels on June 11, 2007 and he spent the season on injured reserve. He was waived by the team on July 24, 2008.

Tampa Bay Buccaneers
On August 16, 2008, Runnels signed with the Tampa Bay Buccaneers after the team released offensive tackle Luke Petitgout. He was released by the team four days later.

Cincinnati Bengals
Runnels was signed to the practice squad of the Cincinnati Bengals on October 29, 2008. He was released on November 11 when the team re-signed cornerback Geoffrey Pope.

Runnels was re-signed to a future contract on December 29, 2008. He was waived on August 10, 2009. His release was profiled on the season premiere of the HBO series Hard Knocks: Training Camp with the Cincinnati Bengals.

Coaching career 
On March 17, 2022, it was announced that Runnels was hired as the Co-Offensive coordinator/Running backs coach of the Houston Gamblers of the United States Football League.

References 

1984 births
Living people
American football fullbacks
Chicago Bears players
Cincinnati Bengals players
Florida Tuskers players
Oklahoma Sooners football players
Tampa Bay Buccaneers players
People from Midwest City, Oklahoma
Players of American football from Oklahoma
Houston Gamblers (2022) coaches